The London Bridge Hospital is a private hospital on the south bank of the River Thames in London.

History

The hospital, which was designed by Llewelyn Davies Weeks and built by Bovis Construction, opened in 1986. It belongs, along with several other well-known private London hospitals, to HCA International, the largest private operator of health care facilities in the world.
 
In April 2006, it expanded its outpatients operations into the adjacent building, St Olaf House - the first art deco building in the UK. Then in November 2013 it took three floors in the Shard and in September 2016 it moved its fertility services to the Shard.

See also
 List of hospitals in England
 The Lister Hospital, London
 HCA

References

External links
 

 

Hospitals in London
HCA Healthcare
Private hospitals in the United Kingdom